Qt Quick is a free software application framework developed and maintained by the Qt Project within the Qt framework. It provides a way of building custom, highly dynamic graphical user interfaces with fluid transitions and effects, which are becoming more common especially in mobile devices. Qt Quick includes a declarative scripting language called QML.

Qt Declarative is a runtime interpreter that reads the Qt declarative user interface definition, QML data, and displays the UI that it describes. The QML syntax allows using JavaScript to provide the logic, and it is often used for this purpose. It is not the only way, however: logic can be written with native code as well.

Qt Quick and QML are officially supported in Qt 4.7 (with Qt Creator 2.1), and it is a commercial option in mobile applications when Qt 4.7 is available for deployment in Symbian and Maemo and MeeGo devices. It was also the native language of Ubuntu Touch.

Version history

See also 
 Clutter, a similar application framework based on GObject

References

External links 
 

2010 software
Qt (software)
Software that uses Qt